János Parti (24 October 1932 – 6 March 1999) was a Hungarian sprint canoeist. He competed in singles at the 1952, 1956 and 1960 Olympics and won one gold and two silver medals. He also won a gold medal in the C-1 1000 m event at the 1954 ICF Canoe Sprint World Championships in Mâcon.

References

External links 

 
 
 

1932 births
1999 deaths
Canoeists at the 1952 Summer Olympics
Canoeists at the 1956 Summer Olympics
Canoeists at the 1960 Summer Olympics
Hungarian male canoeists
Olympic canoeists of Hungary
Olympic gold medalists for Hungary
Olympic silver medalists for Hungary
Olympic medalists in canoeing
ICF Canoe Sprint World Championships medalists in Canadian
Medalists at the 1960 Summer Olympics
Medalists at the 1956 Summer Olympics
Medalists at the 1952 Summer Olympics
Canoeists from Budapest
20th-century Hungarian people